Wale Ojo is a British Nigerian actor. He started as a child actor in television. He subsequently continued acting roles in the UK and Nigeria. He came into prominence in 1995 for his role in The Hard Case. He won the award for Best Actor at the 2012 Nigeria Entertainment Awards for this leading role in Phone Swap, and has been featuring in several movies ever since.

Early life and education
Ojo was acting professionally as a child. At the age of 8, he worked with Akin Lewis, who played a barber on the NTA Ibadan 1980s television series Why Worry. At age 12, he moved with his family to England, where he also attended university.

Ojo credits his career on influences from his mother, who was an actress and supportive of his career, Chief Wale Ogunyemi, Tunji Oyelana, playwright Wole Soyinka, and Zulu Sofola.

New Nigeria Cinema
Ojo founded New Nigeria Cinema, whose aim is to improve the quality of Nigerian films. New Nigeria Cinema hosted a film viewing and lectures at the British Film Institute in London in 2010.

Career performances

TV programs

Films

Theatre

Awards and nominations

See also
 List of Nigerian film producers

References

External links

 The Virgo Foundation, Ojo's charitable organisation

Living people
Year of birth missing (living people)
20th-century Nigerian male actors
21st-century Nigerian male actors
Alumni of the University of Hull
Black British male actors
British people of Nigerian descent
Male actors in Yoruba cinema
Nigerian expatriates in the United Kingdom
Nigerian film award winners
Nigerian film directors
Nigerian film producers
Nigerian male film actors
Nigerian male television actors
Yoruba male actors